Haki Abaz Skuqi (1 March 1958 – 22 October 1986) was a decorated Albanian pilot and crew commander of the Kuçova Regiment.

Skuqi was born in Lekaj, a small village near Kavajë in the present-day Rrogozhinë municipality. He graduated from the Air Force Academy of Tirana and served as a Mig-19 fighter pilot. During a routine flight on 22 October 1986 his plane suffered a serious breakdown and crashed, killing him instantly. Skuqi was declared "Martyr of the Nation" by a Council of Ministers decree no.228 dated 22.04.1996 and his body lays rest in the Martyrs Cemetery in Tirana.

References

Pilots from Kavajë
Albanian aviators
1958 births
1986 deaths
Victims of aviation accidents or incidents in Albania